Lianxing is a subdistrict of You County, Hunan, China. it was created on December 27, 2011.

History
On December 27, 2011, dividing Chengguan Town into Lianxing and Jiangqiao two subdistricts, nine villages of the former Chengguan Town, five villages of Liantang'ao Town, two villages of the former Shangyunqiao Town were merged to Lianxing Subdistrict. On November 26, 2015, the historic Shangyunqiao Town was amalgamated to Lianxing Subdistrict.

Subdivisions
Lianxing Subdistrict is divided into 13 communities and 10 villages in 2016.
13 communities
 Baihua  Community (百花社区)
 Fukang  Community (富康社区)
 Gaoling  Community (高岭社区)
 Houshi  Community (侯市社区)
 Lianxi  Community (联西社区)
 Lianxing  Community (联星社区)
 Qiliping  Community (七里坪社区)
 Shenli Community (胜利社区)
 Songjiaiao  Community (宋家洲社区)
 Wanguqiao  Community (万古桥社区)
 Wenhu Community (文化社区)
 Xuehua  Community (雪花社区)
 Yongjia Community (永佳社区)

10 villages
 Dawu (大屋村)
 Fengjia'ao (冯家坳村)
 Gaoan (高岸村)
 Gaochetou (高车头村)
 Houlian (侯联村)
 Shangyunqiao (上云桥村)
 Shapipi (沙陵陂村)
 Taiqingtang (泰青塘村)
 Tianfu (田富村)
 Zhenjiang (圳江村)

References

Divisions of You County